is an open-air museum in Kōnan-ku, Niigata, Japan. It contains the well known mansion of a wealthy farming family called , gardens and houses from the Edo period. There is also a branch in Chūō-ku, Niigata.

Access
There is a bus stop '' near the museum. Transit bus operated by Niigata Kotsu S94 and S95 (line: S9) runs from Niigata Station Bandai Exit.

There is also YOKO-BUS stop ''. YOKO-BUS runs from Shin'etsu Main Line Ogikawa Station.

Surrounding area

The museum is in the central area of former , the subsidiary of Shibata Domain.

References

External links
 Northern Culture Museum 
 Facilities in Konan Ward 

Museums in Niigata Prefecture
Buildings and structures in Niigata (city)